Musink is a scorewriting computer program for Windows. It is a WYSIWYM (What You See Is What You Mean) editor, with automated music- and page-layout functionality. Two versions of Musink exist: Musink Lite, which is freeware; and Musink Pro, which is not free but contains additional features.

User interface 
To enter notes on the score, the user Musink clicks 'guide notes' - notes which appear under the cursor but do not appear in the final score. Musink automatically determines note and rest durations. As such, Musink does not require the 'note toolbox' tool which appears in similar programs.

The user interface is WYSIWYM and displays musical notes on screen in a long ribbon. Voices of staves are separated during editing. When a score is published to PDF, music is automatically laid out on a page, voices are combined and note positions are fine tuned.

Functionality 

Musink automatically takes care of many of the basic rules of music notation, such as correct stem direction and vertical alignment of multiple rhythmic values, as well as established rules for positioning of noteheads on chords. Stem directions and mark positions can also be manually adjusted. Projects can be split into unrelated sections, allowing creation of documents such as exercise books.

However, Musink does not follow standard notational rules regarding the angles of beams connecting two or more notes per beat. Instead, it renders all beams horizontally (see example), making it unsuitable for publishing.

Drum and percussion support 
Musink supports a number of marks and settings specific for drummers. These include sticking marks, ghost note brackets, flam-style gracenotes, and special notehead shapes. Layout settings for staves can also be switched to 'drum default' layout rules.

MIDI 
Projects can be played from Musink during editing through connected MIDI devices, including VST instruments. Project sections can be exported as MIDI files. The software will also export bars of music as MIDI loops. Musink Pro additionally supports live MIDI recording, MIDI step-input, and MIDI-file import operations.

PDF creation 

Musink allows projects to be exported as PDFs, XPS documents and PNG files. Publishing to one of these formats is completely automated, including the arranging of music into rows and pages. A project can be published any number of times, and can be edited after publishing.

Templates 
Musink uses 'templates' which define how scores appear when they are published. Templates define aspects of the pages such as:
 Fonts and font sizes
 Notation size
 Page and gutter margins
 Placement of titles
 Title pages
 Vertical spacing between rows and sections
When publishing, the user can choose which template they would like their score to be published with. Musink ships with 16 templates, including two for children. It also provides template import functionality.

See also 
List of scorewriters
Comparison of scorewriters
Musical notation
List of music software

References

External links 
 http://www.musink.net

Scorewriters
Freeware